Kornelimünster is a town in the rural Münsterländchen area of Kornelimünster/Walheim, a district of Aachen, Germany.

History 
The Kornelimünster Abbey was founded in 814 on the Inde River by Benedict of Aniane (750–821), at the suggestion of Louis the Pious, son and successor of Charlemagne. The cloister was originally called Redeemer Cloister on the Inde (Erlöserkloster an der Inde).

In the middle of the 9th century, the cloister was given imperial immediacy and subsequently came into possession of a large swath of area surrounding the church. 
 
In 875, certain reliquaries were exchanged for one belonging to the martyr saint, Pope Cornelius (who died in 253). The cloister thereafter became known as Sancti Cornelii ad Indam (St Cornelius on the Inde), and then Kornelimünster. Today, the official title of the abbey is the Abbey of St Benedict of Aniane and Pope Cornelius.

In 1500 the abbey became part of the Lower Rhenish–Westphalian Circle, and in 1802, the area fell to the French. Along with other abbeys in French controlled areas, the abbey at Kornelimünster was abolished and the monks were forced to leave. During this time, the community of Kornelimünster came under administration of the French, under the Mairie system. In 1815 Prussia came into possession of Kornelimünster and was subsequently administered as part of the old district of Aachen (before the administrative restructuring of 1972). Benedictine monks returned to the Kornelimünster Abbey in 1906 to found the New Benedictine Kornelimünster Abbey. The St Cornelius Church of the former abbey is today the parish church of the community and is the oldest abbey building still used in the state of North Rhine-Westphalia.

During World War II U.S. forces reached the area south of Aachen in the fall of 1944. On 19 September Kornelimünster was captured without major damage. The first summary court in Germany during World War II opened in Kornelimünster late in September.

In 1971 Kornelimünster joined together with other area communities such as Breinig, Mulartshütte, Roetgen, Venwegen and Walheim to argue in favor of creating a Münsterland district. Instead, on 1 January 1972, the area was divided as follows: the Kornelimünster and Walheim communities were combined into the Kornelimünster/Walheim district of Aachen, while Breinig and Venwegen went to Stolberg. The remaining communities of Mulartshütte, Rott and Roetgen were combined into the Roetgen district.

Politics

Mayors 
 1945–1952: Karl Siemons
 1952–1956: Viktor Hoven, FDP
 1969–1971: Egon von Reth

Traffic 

Kornelimünster no longer lies along the Bundesstraße 258, which connected Aachen to the Eifel. The nearest onramp of the Autobahn 44 (E40) is in Brand, another district of Aachen. Kornelimünster is, however, reachable by bicycle along the Vennbahn bike path.

Notable persons 
 Johann Josef Brammertz (1668–1729), organ builder
 Hubert Giesen (1898–1980), Pianist
 Viktor Hoven (1909–1968), Politician (FDP), Member of Parliament (Bundestag), Member of Parliament (Landtag)

Nearby towns 

 Oberforstbach
 Brand
 Schleckheim
 Breinig
 Venwegen
 Walheim
 Nütheim
 Dorff

Regular events 

 Open-air carnival
 Christmas market
 Historical fairs

Works cited 
 Die Heiligthumsfahrt zu Cornelimünster : eine Festgabe für die frommen Wallfahrer zu derselben. Urlichs, Aachen 1860

External links 

Information on the city district of Kornelimünster-Walheim, from the homepage of the city of Aachen
 Website of the Kornelimünster Abbey gardens with detailed information, pictures, and schedules related to Kornelimünster
 “The minor sins of monks - The Choir Stalls of Kornelimünster”

References 

Aachen
Towns in North Rhine-Westphalia